Wuyu may refer to:

 Emperor Shizong of Liao (personal name: 兀欲, pinyin: Wùyù)
 Wu Chinese (Chinese: 吳語, pinyin: Wúyǔ)
 Marquis Wuyu of Yue, first ruler of the state of Yue in ancient China